Omar Hilale (Tamazight: ⵄⵓⵎⴰⵔ ⵀⵉⵍⴰⵍ; ; born 1 January 1951 in Agadir) is a Moroccan career diplomat. He has been Morocco's Permanent Representative to the United Nations in New York since he was appointed in this position in April 2014. He used to be the permanent representative of Morocco to the UN in Geneva. 

Hilale is a graduate of the Mohammed V University in Rabat where he obtained a bachelor's degree in political science in 1974. He served in many diplomatic posts such as ambassador to Singapore, New Zealand, Australia and Indonesia, between 1996 and 2001. He was the General Secretary of the Ministry of Foreign Affairs and Cooperation between 2005 and 2008. In November 2008 he became Representative of Morocco to the UN in Geneva. On 8 April 2020, he was appointed co-facilitator for the process of strengthening the United Nations human rights treaty bodies.

In February 2021 he presented a letter to the UN from on behalf of Morocco, alleging that the Polisario Front fabricated reports of armed conflict and human rights violations against the Sahrawi people and incited violence in league with Algerian state media. He specifically denounced Sultana Khaya as "a supporter of violence" and for using "human rights for political ends". Moroccan authorities have kept her under de facto house arrest since 2020, and Khaya has been repeatedly attacked, subject to sexual assault and raids on her house, as reported by a number of human rights groups.

References

1951 births
Living people
People from Agadir
Mohammed V University alumni
Permanent Representatives of Morocco to the United Nations
Ambassadors of Morocco to Indonesia
Ambassadors of Morocco to Australia
Ambassadors of Morocco to Singapore
Ambassadors of Morocco to New Zealand
20th-century Moroccan people
21st-century Moroccan people